

By province and territory
 List of museums in Alberta
 List of museums in British Columbia
 List of museums in Manitoba
 List of museums in New Brunswick
 List of museums in Newfoundland and Labrador
 List of museums in the Northwest Territories
 List of museums in Nova Scotia
 List of museums in Ontario
 List of museums in Prince Edward Island
 List of museums in Quebec
 List of museums in Saskatchewan
 List of museums in Yukon

See also 

 Military and war museums in Canada
 National museums of Canada
 Canadian Museums Association
 Historiography of Canada
 Organization of Military Museums of Canada Inc.

External links 

 Virtual Museum of Canada

 
Museums
 List